Asphodelus bakeri is a species of asphodel from the western Himalaya.

References

Asphodeloideae
Plants described in 1947